Paul Ernest Held, Jr. (October 20, 1927 – July 19, 2019) was a quarterback in the National Football League.

Biography
Held was born in El Segundo, California. Held was drafted in the nineteenth round of the 1953 NFL Draft by the Detroit Lions and later played with the Pittsburgh Steelers and the Green Bay Packers. He played at the collegiate level at San Diego State University.

See also
List of Pittsburgh Steelers players
List of Green Bay Packers players

References

1927 births
2019 deaths
People from El Segundo, California
Pittsburgh Steelers players
Green Bay Packers players
American football quarterbacks
San Jose State Spartans football players
Sportspeople from Los Angeles County, California
Players of American football from California